A Connecticut Yankee in King Arthur's Court is a 1921 American silent film adaptation of Mark Twain's 1889 novel A Connecticut Yankee in King Arthur's Court. The film was produced by the Fox Film Corporation (later 20th Century Fox) and directed by Emmett J. Flynn based on a screenplay by Bernard McConville. It is notable as the first film adaptation of Twain's novel and as the second film about time travel to the past (after The Ghost of Slumber Mountain).

The film stars Harry Myers as the titular Yankee Martin Cavendish. After reading Twain's novel, Cavendish dreams that he, like Twain's protagonist Henry Morgan, is transported back to the time of King Arthur (Charles Clary), where he must use modern know-how to outwit the king's foes Morgan le Fay (Rosemary Theby) and Merlin (William V. Mong). The screenplay modernizes the novel with many contemporary references, including mentions of Ford Model Ts, the Volstead Act, and the Battle of the Argonne Forest. The film was popular, and its success likely encouraged Fox to produce the later sound film adaptation of the novel, A Connecticut Yankee. According to author Barbara Leaming, the film's hanging scene inspired Tom Hepburn, brother of Katharine Hepburn, to commit suicide in 1921.

The film is incomplete in the Library of Congress, and only reels 2, 4 and 7 survive.

Plot summary

Cast
 Harry Myers as Martin Cavendish (as Harry C. Myers)
 Pauline Starke as Sandy
 Rosemary Theby  as Queen Morgan le Fay
 Charles Clary as King Arthur
 William V. Mong as Merlin the Magician
 George Siegmann as Sir Sagramore
 Charles Gordon as Clarence, the Page
 Karl Formes as Mark Twain
 Herbert Fortier as Mr. Cavendish
 Adele Farrington as Mrs. Cavendish
 Wilfred McDonald as Sir Lancelot

Reception
The film was the seventh-biggest hit of 1922 in the US and Canada.

References

 Lacy, Norris J. (1991). The New Arthurian Encyclopedia. New York: Garland. .

External links

 
 
 
 

1921 films
1920s fantasy adventure films
American silent feature films
Arthurian films
American fantasy adventure films
1920s fantasy comedy films
Films based on fantasy novels
Films based on A Connecticut Yankee in King Arthur's Court
Fox Film films
Films about time travel
Films directed by Emmett J. Flynn
Films based on American novels
Films set in England
American black-and-white films
Lost American films
1920s adventure comedy films
American adventure comedy films
American fantasy comedy films
Films with screenplays by Bernard McConville
1921 comedy films
1920s American films
Silent American comedy films
Silent adventure films